These are the official results of the Women's 1,500 metres event at the 1982 European Championships in Athens, Greece. The final was held at Olympic Stadium "Spiros Louis" on 11 September 1982.

Medalists

Final

Participation
According to an unofficial count, 13 athletes from 10 countries participated in the event.

 (1)
 (1)
 (1)
 (1)
 (1)
 (1)
 (2)
 (3)
 (1)
 (1)

See also
 1978 Women's European Championships 1,500 metres (Prague)
 1980 Women's Olympic 1,500 metres (Moscow)
 1983 Women's World Championships 1,500 metres (Helsinki)
 1984 Women's Olympic 1,500 metres (Los Angeles)
 1986 Women's European Championships 1,500 metres (Stuttgart)
 1987 Women's World Championships 1,500 metres (Rome)
 1988 Women's Olympic 1,500 metres (Seoul)

References

 Results

1500 metres
1500 metres at the European Athletics Championships
1982 in women's athletics